A bichon is a distinct type of toy dog; it is typically kept as a companion dog. Believed to be descended from the Barbet, it is believed the bichon-type dates to at least the 11th century; it was relatively common in 14th-century France, where they were kept as pets of the royalty and aristocracy. From France, these dogs spread throughout the courts of Europe, with dogs of very similar form being seen in a number of portraits of the upper classes of Germany, Portugal and Spain; from Europe, the type also spread to colonies in Africa and South America. The name "bichon" is believed to be a contraction of "barbichon",  which means "little barbet".

Breeds

Bichon Frisé

The Bichon Frise, formally known as the Bichon Tenerife, Tenerife dog or Canary Island lap dog, was bred on the island of Tenerife; it was believed to be descended from bichon-type dogs introduced from Spain in the 16th century. From the Canary Islands, the breed was imported back to the Continent where it became the sometimes favourite of the European courts, its fortunes depending upon the fashions of the time; during an ebb in the breed's popularity it found its way into a number of circuses, performing throughout Europe with organ grinders. The breed again fell out of favour from the end of the 19th century and it was due to the efforts of Belgian and French enthusiasts in the 1930s that rescued it from extinction, which is why it is today recognised as a Franco-Belgian dog breed.

Bolognese

The Bolognese, also known as the Bichon Bolognese, Bolognese toy dog, Bologneser, Gutschen Hundle or Schoshundle, it takes its name from the northern Italian city of Bologne, it is usually claimed the breed descends from the Maltese. It is believed examples of the breed were kept by the Medici family, who gave these dogs as gifts to garner favour, it is said Louis XIV of France, Philip II of Spain and Catherine the Great of Russia, among other European rulers, all kept some.

Bolonka

The Bolonka, also known as the Bolonka Zwetna, is a recently developed breed from Russia, it is a coloured variation of the all-white Bolognese that was established as a breed in 1988.

Coton de Tuléar

The Coton de Tuléar takes its name from the Madagascan port town of Tuléar, where it originated. The ancestors of these dogs were likely brought to Madagascar in the 17th century, where they became extremely popular with the local ruling class; they became so popular that laws were passed to prevent them being owned by commoners. The breed was relatively unknown to the outside world until the 1970s, when examples were exported to Europe and North America.

Havanese

The Havanese, also known as the Cuban shock dog, Bichon Havanais, Havana silk dog, Havana Spaniel, Havana Bichon or sometimes just the Havana, is a bichon-type breed from Cuba, taking its name from Havana. The breed is believed to be descended from bichon-type dogs imported to Cuba by Europeans in the 18th century, where it thrived. The breed's fortunes turned with the Cuban Revolution in the 1950s, the Communists saw these dogs as the property of the former elite and sought to eliminate it; the breed was saved by expatriates who fled with their pets to the United States.

Löwchen

The Löwchen, whose name means "little lion dog" in German, is another French breed of the bichon-type. The breed was known as early as the 16th century; by the 1970s, it was estimated only 70 remained, although thanks to a publicity drive the breed has recovered. Usually clipped to resemble a lion with a mane, when its hair grows naturally its resemblance to other breeds of the type is clear.

Maltese

The Maltese, sometimes called the Bichon Maltaise, is claimed to be descended from dogs brought to Malta by the Phoenicians in ancient times, proponents of this theory cite ancient artwork from Malta with dogs of similar form, although the first concrete record of this breed dates from 1805 when the Knights of Malta wrote that the once famous local dog was almost extinct. Today's Maltese is likely the result of subsequent crosses, and they became increasingly popular throughout the 19th and 20th centuries.

See also
 Dogs portal
 List of dog breeds

References

Citations

Bibliography
 
 
 
 

Dog types